Erigeron lanuginosus is a Chinese species of flowering plants in the family Asteraceae. It grows on alpine slopes at high elevations in Tibet.

Erigeron lanuginosus is a perennial, clump-forming herb up to 25 cm (10 inches) tall, forming a branching, woody rhizome. Its flower heads have bright purple ray florets surrounding yellow disc florets.

References

lanuginosus
Flora of Tibet
Plants described in 1981